The 2015 Ethiopian uprising was mass protests and riots as a wave of unprecedented protests that swept Ethiopia after the Addis Ababa Master Plan was announced on 12 November.

Background
After years of drought, conflict, wars and marginalisation among communities, the community of Oromo and Amhara came out onto the streets demonstrating the government’s proposals. Demands quickly grew and protests spiralled out of control from peaceful, sustained opposition anti-government rallies to violent riots.

Protests
Mass protests rocked Oromia and Amhara regions while riot police, the military and security forces was deployed to disperse and crush the protests. Protesters called on the resignation on prime minister Hailemariam Desalegn. Rallies, bitter clashes and marches was taking place nationwide amid growing opposition and increasingly violent street demonstrations and battles against the military, who fired live ammunition and rubber bullets to disperse protesters.

Poor living standards and marginalisation of Oromo people in the country sparked ethnic tensions and sour clashes between groups. 140 protesters have been killed in the popular uprising which ultimately led to the 2015–16 Oromo protests.

See also
 2016 Ethiopian protests

References

Riots and civil disorder in Ethiopia
Protests in Ethiopia
2015 protests